The 2022 Davis Cup World Group I was held on 15–18 September. The twelve winners from the World Group I will play at the Qualifying round and the twelve losers will play at the World Group I Play-offs in 2023.

Teams
Twenty-four teams participated in the World Group I, in series decided on a home and away basis. The seedings are based on the Nations Ranking of 7 March 2022.

These twenty-four teams were:
 11 losing teams from Qualifying round, in March 2022
 12 winning teams from World Group I Play-offs, in March 2022
 1 highest-ranked losing team from World Group I Play-offs (Uzbekistan)

The 12 winning teams from the World Group I will play at the Qualifying round and the 12 losing teams will play at the World Group I Play-offs in 2023.

#: Nations Ranking as of 7 March 2022.

Seeded teams
  (#16)
  (#17)
  (#18)
  (#19)
  (#22)
  (#23)
  (#24)
  (#25)
  (#26)
  (#27)
  (#28)
  (#29)

Unseeded teams
  (#30)
  (#31)
  (#32)
  (#33)
  (#34)
  (#35)
  (#36)
  (#37)
  (#38)
  (#39)
  (#40)
  (#45)

Results summary

World Group I results

Austria vs. Pakistan

Colombia vs. Turkey

Israel vs. Czech Republic

Uzbekistan vs. Japan

Ecuador vs. Switzerland

Peru vs. Chile

Portugal vs. Brazil

Norway vs. India

Ukraine vs. Hungary

Slovakia vs. Romania

Finland vs. New Zealand

Bosnia and Herzegovina vs. Mexico

References

External links

World Group I
Davis Cup
Davis Cup
Davis Cup